Rūdaki is a crater on Mercury. On the floor of Rudaki and also in a broad region surrounding it to the west are smooth plains, which are far less cratered than the neighboring terrain (except for the small secondary craters from Calvino crater, to the west of Rudaki). Detailed studies of Mariner 10 images led to the conclusion that these plains near Rūdaki, now called Sihtu Planitia, were formed by volcanic flows on the surface of Mercury.

References

Impact craters on Mercury